The second season of the American television series The Flash, which is based on the DC Comics character Barry Allen / Flash, sees Barry recognized as a hero in Central City after saving the city, only to face a new threat from a parallel universe in the form of the speedster Zoom, who seeks to eliminate everyone connected to the Speed Force throughout the multiverse. It is set in the Arrowverse, sharing continuity with the other television series of the universe, and is a spin-off of Arrow. The season was produced by Berlanti Productions, Warner Bros. Television, and DC Entertainment, with Andrew Kreisberg, Gabrielle Stanton, Aaron Helbing, and Todd Helbing serving as showrunners.

The season was ordered in January 2015, and filmed from that July to the following April in Vancouver. Grant Gustin stars as Barry, alongside principal cast members Candice Patton, Danielle Panabaker, Carlos Valdes, Tom Cavanagh, and Jesse L. Martin also returning from the first season, and are joined by Keiynan Lonsdale. This season also introduces characters from Legends of Tomorrow, which was being developed as a spin-off.

The season ran for 23 episodes and premiered on October 6, 2015, airing on The CW until May 24, 2016. The premiere was watched by 3.58 million viewers, down from the first-season premiere but average for the series. The second season of The Flash received universal acclaim from critics, being viewed as an improvement over the first season, and finished as the 112th ranked show, slightly up from season one, with an average viewership of 4.25 million. The series was renewed for a third season on March 11, 2016.

Episodes

Cast and characters

Main 
 Grant Gustin as Barry Allen / Flash and Bartholomew Allen 
 Candice Patton as Iris West and Iris West-Allen 
 Danielle Panabaker as Caitlin Snow and Killer Frost 
 Carlos Valdes as Cisco Ramon / Vibe and Reverb 
 Keiynan Lonsdale as Wally West 
 Tom Cavanagh as Harry Wells 
 Jesse L. Martin as Joe West and Joseph West

Recurring 
John Wesley Shipp as Henry Allen
Shipp also portrays Jay Garrick / Flash of Earth-3
Patrick Sabongui as David Singh
Sabongui also briefly portrays Singh's Earth-2 doppelgänger
Teddy Sears as Hunter Zolomon / Zoom
Sears also briefly portrays Zolomon's Earth-1 doppelgänger, a non-metahuman
Victor Garber as Martin Stein / Firestorm
Wentworth Miller as Leonard Snart / Captain Cold
Shantel VanSanten as Patty Spivot
Vanessa Estelle Williams as Francine West
Ciara Renée as Kendra Saunders / Chay-Ara / Hawkgirl
Violett Beane as Jesse Chambers Wells

Guest

Production

Development 
On January 11, 2015, The Flash was renewed for a second season. With the commencement of production on the season, former Arrow and Ugly Betty writer Gabrielle Stanton was promoted to executive producer and showrunner; after having served as consulting producer and writer on the first season's finale "Fast Enough". However, it was later reported that series co-creator Andrew Kreisberg would be returning to sole showrunner duties at an unspecified time. That time was later proved to be at the start of 2016, "Potential Energy", when Stanton was no longer credited as being involved with the show. Aaron and Todd Helbing also served as the season's showrunners.

Casting 
Main cast members Grant Gustin, Candice Patton, Danielle Panabaker, Carlos Valdes and Jesse L. Martin return from the first season as Barry Allen / The Flash, Iris West, Caitlin Snow, Cisco Ramon / Vibe and Joe West, respectively. Tom Cavanagh, who portrayed Eobard Thawne impersonating Harrison Wells in season one, also returned as a regular, playing Wells' Earth-2 doppelgänger. Rick Cosnett, a main cast member from season one, did not return as a regular because his character, Eddie Thawne, died in the season one finale. He instead returned as a guest star in the season premiere "The Man Who Saved Central City" in a dream sequence, and later in the episode "Flash Back", where Barry travels back to a time when Eddie was still alive. In August 2015, Keiynan Lonsdale was cast as Wally West, the unknown son of Joe, and Iris' brother. Gustin, Patton, Panabaker, Valdes and Martin also portray the Earth-2 versions of their characters in the episode "Welcome to Earth-2", while Cavanagh portrays Thawne impersonating the Earth-1 Wells in "The Man Who Saved Central City" and "Flash Back".

Discussing the casting of Lonsdale, Kreisberg stated, "Just like when we met Grant [Gustin] for the first time, we instantly knew Keiynan embodied all the heart and courage of a hero. We are so excited to be bringing this much-beloved character onto the show." It was always intended for Wally to be the son of Joe and brother of Iris, which differs from the character's comic history, as the producers disliked second seasons of television series that would introduce cousins of characters that were never previously mentioned, feeling it was "weird". Lonsdale originally auditioned for Legends of Tomorrow to portray Jefferson "Jax" Jackson.

In July 2015, it was announced that Teddy Sears would recur in the role of Jay Garrick, the Flash of Earth-2. However, later in the season it was revealed that his character was actually Hunter Zolomon / Zoom posing as Jay. Ryan Handley portrayed Zoom in costume prior to this revelation, while Tony Todd voiced Zoom.

Design 
Maya Mani replaced Colleen Atwood as the costume designer for the second season and made slight changes to the Flash costume, such as changing the color of his chest emblem from red to white, being faithful to the Flash costume from the comics. Gustin stated that, around the time of filming the season's ninth episode, "we stopped gluing the mask to my face and switched to a mask that just slipped on and off with a zipper". While Zoom's costume in the comics is a verbatim replica of Eobard Thawne's yellow-and-red Reverse-Flash costume, the costume seen in the TV series is entirely in black. Kreisberg compared Zoom's appearance to that of the Marvel Comics character Venom, saying, "The Zoom outfit is much more organic than the Reverse-Flash suit. In a way, it's hard to tell if it is a suit or alive… There's no skin showing, for all you know there's a robot underneath, or dark energy."

Filming 
Production on the season began on July 7, 2015, in Vancouver, British Columbia, and concluded on April 18, 2016.

Music 
Composer Blake Neely returned as the primary composer for the second season. The soundtrack for the second season was released digitally on July 22, 2016 and in CD format on July 26, 2016. Neely also composed a theme when Gustin as Barry appeared on the eighteenth episode of Supergirl, "Worlds Finest". The theme was titled "World's Finest" when it was released on the Supergirl: Season 1 soundtrack.

All music composed by Blake Neely.

Arrowverse tie-ins 
In October 2015, Arrow showrunner Wendy Mericle revealed that the producers of the Arrowverse had begun having someone track all the characters and plots used by each series, in order to make sure everything lines up, though Aaron Helbing noted in April 2016 that "sometimes the schedules don't line up exactly...and that stuff is out of our control", such as when Barry is shown using his abilities on Arrow that month, while not having them the same week on The Flash.

The second season of The Flash began to explore the concept of the multiverse, by introducing Earth-2, which features doppelgängers of the inhabitants in the Arrowverse (or Earth-1). In "Welcome to Earth-2" of The Flash, glimpses of the multiverse are seen, including an image of Supergirl star Melissa Benoist as Supergirl and an image of John Wesley Shipp as the Flash from the 1990 television series, implying that those two television series exist on alternate Earths to the Arrowverse.

The second annual two-way crossover with Arrow aired on December 1 and 2, 2015, where the Flash and the Green Arrow team up to take on Vandal Savage, who is looking for Kendra Saunders and Carter Hall, the reincarnations of Hawkgirl and Hawkman. Though Legends of Tomorrow did not have an episode as part of the 2015–16 crossover, the Arrow and The Flash episodes from this event did set up a number of characters who star and recur in that series. Casper Crump, Falk Hentschel and Peter Francis James debut in the crossover, as Vandal Savage, Carter Hall / Hawkman, and Dr. Aldus Boardman, respectively. ScreenRant's Alice Walker discussed how the annual Arrow/The Flash crossover suffered from also trying to set up Legends, which was "too much to ask from the already crowded storylines and ended up feeling like an exercise in synchronicity, with producers planting more seeds than they could reap. The crossover event was no longer a fun way to contrast the two shows; it now had to serve the much larger purpose of setting up an entirely new world."

Crossover with Supergirl 
In February 2016, it was announced that Gustin would appear on the eighteenth episode of Supergirl, with Berlanti and Kreisberg, also Supergirl executive producers, thanking "the fans and journalists who have kept asking for this to happen. It is our pleasure and hope to create an episode worthy of everyone's enthusiasm and support." While no plot details on the episodes were released at the time, Ross A. Lincoln of Deadline Hollywood noted that "the in-universe reason" for the crossover was due to Barry's ability to travel to various dimensions, thus implying that Supergirl exists on an alternate Earth to the Arrowverse in a multiverse. "Welcome to Earth-2" confirmed this, showing an image of Benoist as Supergirl during a sequence where characters travel through that multiverse. The Earth that the series inhabits has been informally referred to as "Earth-CBS" by Marc Guggenheim, one of the creators of Arrow.

In "Worlds Finest", which aired on CBS on March 28, 2016, Supergirl is established as being in an alternate universe where the Flash helps Kara fight the Silver Banshee and Livewire in exchange for her help in returning home. The episode title was inspired by the World's Finest Comics series, in which Superman would team up with various other DC superheroes, including the Flash. The events of this episode take place between two moments in the eighteenth episode of The Flash season two, "Versus Zoom", which aired on April 19, 2016, in which Barry enters and exits a breach while wearing the tachyon device seen in this episode. The crossover required "a lot more logistical trickery" than the usual Arrowverse crossovers due to Gustin filming The Flash in Vancouver alongside Arrow and Legends of Tomorrow, while Supergirl is produced in Los Angeles. The producers chose to use the Flash as the character to crossover, due to his ability to travel between various Earths, and because it was "a little more fun at first to bring the veteran from that show to the chemistry of a new show." Berlanti stated that "in a perfect world", the crossover would have featured both Gustin and Amell's Green Arrow, "but logistically that would have been a nightmare to try and do both shows. We had to facilitate one." Gustin was optimistic that the crossover in 2016 would allow another crossover the following year with the rest of the Arrowverse shows.

The crossover episode received excellent reviews. Cliff Wheatley of IGN gave the episode an 8.6/10, stating "After the grim 'n' gritty Batman v Superman, Supergirl "Worlds Finest" offered a fun, upbeat palette cleanser and one of the series' strongest episodes to date. Instead of the usual "beatdown" introduction, Supergirl and the Flash went straight to being superfriends, which was refreshing. Not only did Barry Allen fit perfectly in Kara's world, but actors Grant Gustin and Melissa Benoist had fantastic chemistry together onscreen. While the city's turnaround on Supergirl's Red K incident was a little sudden, overall, "Worlds Finest" was delightful." Stacy Glanzman of TV Fanatic gave the episode a 5.0 out of 5 stars.

Marketing 
The Flash surged 1,378% in buzz (highest year over year growth in conversation) from last year for its second season.

Release

Broadcast 
The season premiered on The CW on October 6, 2015, and ran until May 24, 2016.

Home media 
The season began streaming on Netflix on October 4, 2016, and was released on Blu-ray and DVD in Region 1 on September 6, 2016.

Copyright infringement 
The second season of The Flash was the fourth most-torrented television show of 2016.

Reception

Ratings 
The second season finished as the 112th ranked show, with an average viewership of 4.25 million.

Critical response 
The review aggregator website Rotten Tomatoes reported a 94% approval rating for the second season with an average rating of 7.84/10, based on 24 reviews. The website's consensus reads, "With distinctive visuals and a terrific cast, The Flash remains one of the strongest comic book shows on television." Metacritic, which uses a weighted average, assigned the season a score of 81 out of 100, based on 4 reviews, indicating "universal acclaim".

Reviewing for Collider, Dave Trumbore gave the season premiere a rating of 4 stars out of 5, saying, "All in all, a very good way to start season two after the strong run of season one." Mike Cecchini of Den of Geek! meanwhile rated the episode 3.5 stars out of 5, criticizing the episode's "unsettled" and "rushed" nature. He felt that the episode "seems so focused on getting this season off to a running start that it [...] doesn't give events time to breathe." Erik Kain of Forbes noted a "very big piece" missing in the absence of Harrison Wells, but felt that the episode was "an excellent start to the sophomore season of the CW’s best super hero show." Although Henry Allen's abrupt exit was a common point of criticism amongst reviewers, Trumbore nevertheless felt that it was "a small price to pay for an otherwise cohesive, entertaining, and emotionally satisfying episode."

The episode "Welcome to Earth-2" received a number of positive reviews. Erik Kain said that it was "The Flash at its best. An engaging, funny, scary episode that hits all the right notes from start to finish." IGN's Jesse Schedeen rated it 9.7 out of 10, praising the concept of Earth-2, Barry's dramatic moments, the depiction of Deathstorm, Killer Frost, and Reverb, but criticized the need to kill off Reverb so soon. He concluded, "The Flash delivered one of its best episodes yet as Barry and friends took a hilarious but emotional trip to Earth-2." Angelica Jade Bastién of Vulture said the episode "marries incredible action sequences, amazing direction by Millicent Shelton, some of the cast's best acting (particularly from Candice Patton and Grant Gustin), lots of heart, and just the right number of nods to the comics. It is undoubtedly the best episode of the season, and just may be the best episode of The Flash yet." Dave Trumbore rated the episode 4 stars out of 5, saying, "This was an absolutely insane episode of The Flash, and that's saying something since this show is normally fast-paced and full of Easter eggs even on a relatively slow week." Entertainment Weeklys Jonathon Dornbush praised the scene where Barry talks to his Earth-2 doppelgänger's mother over phone, saying Gustin "has proved mightily adept at tackling Barry's grief, hope, and the many other emotions swirling around in regard to his mother and her death." Scott Von Doviak of The A.V. Club said, "Since its return from hiatus, The Flash has been sluggish and morose, and the Zoom arc has fizzled. 'Welcome to Earth-2' jump-starts both the storyline and the season as a whole [...and] is just about as good as The Flash gets."

Reviewing the season finale, Allison Keene of Collider directed specific praise to Gustin's performance, saying "Sometimes a great TV performer can come out of an already fantastic episode, but occasionally an actor can rise above the material, proving that even though the writers have let them down, the actor is going to make the most of what they’ve been given. That’s exactly where we find ourselves with The Flashs head-scratching finale, which capped off a largely enjoyable but ultimately uneven second season. What has never been in doubt, though, is star Grant Gustin’s ability to convince viewers that this all makes sense in an emotional, earnest, and often light-hearted way." In his review for Nerdist, Joseph McCabe concluded, "For all this season's faults, most of which came from repeating the major villain arc of season one, [...] there were moments in the last handful of episodes where Barry demonstrated more independent thought than the show often allows him. Coming up with his own ideas, for example, to defeat the villain of the week rather than relying on his friends at STAR Labs. That's the Barry I want to see more of in season three.

A number of critics felt that the season as a whole suffered from the standards set by its predecessor, calling it "uneven" and criticizing the handling of the season's main villain. Collider's Kayti Burt gave the season 3 stars out of 5, saying, "The Flash finished off an uneven season with an uneven finale that couldn't overcome the burden of an underdeveloped, illogical villain. With Zoom, The Flash fell victim to a common drama mistake of a contemporary TV era: it prioritized the plot twist over the well-developed character arc." Jeff Jensen of Entertainment Weekly gave the season a "B−" grade, calling it "certifiably slumptacular" and said that the "bold" introduction of the multiverse did not meet his expectations. Jensen praised Barry's onscreen rapport with Joe but felt it was underutilized due to the introduction of Joe's biological son Wally, and criticized Barry's romantic fixation for Iris. He also criticized Zoom, saying, "He began as an alluring mystery but lost zip over time" and once his identity was revealed, "became a weak embodiment of generic villainy". Jesse Schedeen gave the entire season a rating of 8.6 out of 10, explaining, "This season met and occasionally even exceeded the heights of its predecessor. But it was also a more uneven and ultimately more flawed experience in the end."

Accolades 

The Flash was included on multiple Best/Top TV Shows of 2015 lists, ranking on The Salt Lake Tribunes (4th), Omaha World-Heralds (7th), and IndieWires (10th), as well as on un-ranked lists of Criticwire and Variety. In its second season, The Flash was nominated for 20 awards, winning five. The series was nominated for three Saturn Awards, winning Best Superhero Adaption Television Series for the second year in a row. The show was also nominated for three Leo Awards, winning again for Best Visual Effects in a Dramatic Series for the episode "Gorilla Warfare". At the 2016 Teen Choice Awards, the show gained six nominations with Gustin winning for Choice TV Actor: Fantasy/Sci-Fi.

|-
! scope="row" rowspan="20" | 2016
| rowspan="2" | Kids' Choice Awards
| Favorite Family TV Show
| The Flash
| 
| 
|-
| Favorite Male TV Star – Family Show
| Grant Gustin
| 
| 
|-
| rowspan="3" | Leo Awards
| Best Direction in a Dramatic Series
| J. J. Makaro ("Enter Zoom")
| 
| 
|-
| Best Visual Effects in a Dramatic Series
| For episode "Gorilla Warfare"
| 
| 
|-
| Best Stunt Coordination in a Dramatic Series
| J. J. Makaro, Jon Kralt ("Legends of Today")
| 
| 
|-
| rowspan="6" | Teen Choice Awards
| Choice TV Show: Fantasy/Sci-Fi
| The Flash
| 
| 
|-
| Choice TV Actor: Fantasy/Sci-Fi
| Grant Gustin
| 
| 
|-
| Choice TV: Chemistry
| Candice Patton and Grant Gustin
| 
| 
|-
| Choice TV: Liplock
| Candice Patton and Grant Gustin
| 
| 
|-
| Choice TV Actress: Fantasy/Sci-Fi
| Danielle Panabaker
| 
| 
|-
| Choice TV: Villain
| Teddy Sears
| 
| 
|-
| rowspan="3" | Saturn Awards
| Best Superhero Adaption Television Series
| The Flash
| 
| 
|-
| Best Actor on Television
| Grant Gustin
| 
| 
|-
| Best Guest Star on Television
| Victor Garber
| 
| 
|-
| rowspan="3" | IGN Awards
| Best Comic Book TV Series
|  The Flash
| 
| 
|-
| Best TV Hero
| Grant Gustin
| 
| 
|-
| Best TV Villain
| Tom Cavanagh
| 
| 
|-
| IGN People's Choice Award
| Best TV Hero
| Grant Gustin
| 
| 
|-
| Poppy Awards
| Best Supporting Actor, Drama
| Jesse L. Martin
| 
| 
|-
| The Joey Awards
| Young Actor in a TV Series Featured Role 11–16 Years
| Octavian Kaul
| 
| 
|-
! scope="row" rowspan="1" | 2017
| Leo Awards
| Best Visual Effects in a Dramatic Series
| Armen V. Kevorkian, James Baldanzi, Thomas Connors, Gevork Babityan, and Marc Lougee for "King Shark"
| 
| 
|-
|}

Notes

References

General references

External links 
 
 

2015 American television seasons
2016 American television seasons
The Flash (2014 TV series) seasons